The Isle of Man has competed seventeen times in the Commonwealth Games to date, beginning in 1958.

History
The Isle of Man first participated at the Games in 1958 in Cardiff, Wales. The Isle of Man has been strongest in Cycling and Shooting events.

Medals
The Isle of Man was thirty-fifth on the all-time medal tally of the Commonwealth Games after the 2022 games in Birmingham, England having won twelve medals since 1958.

References
{{reflist|refs=

External links
Official Website Isle of Man Commonwealth Games Association

 
Nations at the Commonwealth Games